Renaissance  was a political party in Monaco that represents the interests of SBM employees. They won 10.67% of the popular vote, and 1 out of 24 seats in the legislative elections held on February 10, 2013. The seat was held by Eric Elena. However, the party did not contest the 2018 elections.

Electoral history

National Council elections

References

Defunct political parties in Monaco